Birrieria La Plaza is a Mexican restaurant in Portland, Oregon, in the United States. Initially operating from a food cart in southeast Portland, the business has announced plans to add a brick and mortar and a stall at Block 216.

Description and history 

The Mexican restaurant Birrieria La Plaza (BLP) operates from a red food cart on Stark Street in southeast Portland, in the parking lot of a discount store. The menu focuses on birria and also includes braised beef and vampiros. The Plaza Plate includes a quesadilla, taco, mulita, tostada, and a cup of consommé.

BLP is owned by Oracio Hernandez. During the COVID-19 pandemic, the restaurant experienced setbacks from beef supply chain issues. In May 2020, Rachel Pinsky of Eater Portland wrote, "At the height of its success a couple months ago, Hernandez’s food cart was going through a thousand pounds of chuck roast a week to make this popular stew. On May 4, the prices offered by his meat supplier for chuck increased by 200 percent. Hernandez was forced to temporarily shut down to find another reliable source of affordable meat."

In January 2023, Eater Portland said the business plans to open a brick and mortar restaurant in the Southeast Division space which previously housed Andale Andale, followed by a stall in the food hall at Block 216.

Reception 

Michael Russell included BLP in The Oregonian's list of "Portland's 10 best new food carts of 2020". In 2021, Tuck Woodstock and Katherine Chew Hamilton of Portland Monthly wrote, "we believe the honor of best quesabirria taco in Portland goes to Birrieria La Plaza". Willamette Week said in 2021, "The birria boom has hit Portland, and the persistent traffic jam outside Birrieria La Plaza signals that it's the chosen one at the moment."

Krista Garcia included the restaurant in Eater Portland's 2021 overview of "Where to Eat in Gresham and East Portland" and said BLP "has quickly become a standout amidst East Portland’s birria belt. The restaurant's crunchy vampiros are a particular favorite, but it's worth taking home as much of the restaurant's deeply savory soup as possible." She also included the business in a list of Portland's 17 "standout" Mexican restaurants and food carts. The website's Zoe Baillargeon included the quesadilla in a list of "Where to Find the Cheesiest Dishes in Portland and Beyond", and Nick Woo and Brooke Jackson-Glidden included BLP in a 2021 "Guide to Portland's Most Outstanding Food Carts". Jackson-Glidden also included the restaurant in Eater Portland's 2022 list of the city's 38 "essential" restaurants and food carts.

See also

 Hispanics and Latinos in Portland, Oregon
 List of Mexican restaurants

References

External links 

 

2019 establishments in Oregon
Food carts in Portland, Oregon
Mexican restaurants in Portland, Oregon
Restaurants established in 2019
Southeast Portland, Oregon